Dixon Township is one of the twelve townships of Preble County, Ohio, United States.  The 2000 census found 557 people in the township.

Geography
Located in the southwestern part of the county, it borders the following townships:
Jackson Township - north
Washington Township - northeast
Gasper Township - east
Somers Township - southeast corner
Israel Township - south
Center Township, Union County, Indiana - southwest
Harrison Township, Union County, Indiana - west
Boston Township, Wayne County, Indiana - northwest

No municipalities are located in Dixon Township.

Name and history
Dixon Township was organized in 1812, and named for county commissioner Eli Dixon. It is the only Dixon Township statewide.

Government
The township is governed by a three-member board of trustees, who are elected in November of odd-numbered years to a four-year term beginning on the following January 1. Two are elected in the year after the presidential election and one is elected in the year before it. There is also an elected township fiscal officer, who serves a four-year term beginning on April 1 of the year after the election, which is held in November of the year before the presidential election. Vacancies in the fiscal officership or on the board of trustees are filled by the remaining trustees.

References

External links
County website

Townships in Preble County, Ohio
Townships in Ohio